Jadavpur Assembly constituency is a Legislative Assembly constituency of South 24 Parganas district in the Indian state of West Bengal.

Overview
As per orders of the Delimitation Commission, No. 150 Jadavpur Assembly constituency is composed of the following: Ward Nos. 96, 99, 101, 102, 103, 104, 105, 106, 109 and 110 of Kolkata Municipal Corporation.
Before 2011, Jadavpur Assembly constituency was composed of the following: Ward Nos. 101, 102, 103, 104, 105, 106, 107, 108, 109, 110, 111, 112, 113, 114 of Kolkata Municipal Corporation.

Jadavpur Assembly constituency is part of No. 22 Jadavpur (Lok Sabha constituency).

The ex-Chief Minister, Buddhadeb Bhattacharjee of the CPI(M) won from this seat 5 times in 1987, 1991, 1996, 2001 and 2006. In the 2011 Assembly Elections, he contested again from this seat while being the Chief Minister of the state, but lost to Manish Gupta of the TMC, by a margin of more than sixteen thousand votes. Manish Gupta served as the Minister for Development and Planning, and later, as the Minister for Power in the newly formed TMC government. However, in 2016, Manish Gupta lost the elections despite his popular image, to Dr. Sujan Chakraborty of the CPI(M) by a margin of more than fourteen thousand votes.

Members of Legislative Assembly

Election results

2021 election
In the 2021 elections, Debabrata Majumder  of Trinamool Congress defeated his nearest rival, Dr. Sujan Chakraborty of CPI(M).

2016 election
In the 2016 elections, Dr. Sujan Chakraborty of the CPI(M) defeated his nearest rival Manish Gupta of the Trinamool Congress.

2011
In the 2011 elections, Manish Gupta of Trinamool Congress defeated his nearest rival Buddhadeb Bhattacharjee of CPI(M).

 

.# Swing calculated on Congress+Trinamool Congress vote percentages taken together in 2006.

2006
In the 2006 elections, Buddhadeb Bhattacharjee of CPI(M) defeated his nearest rival Dipak Kumar Ghosh of AITC

 

.# Swing calculated on Trinamool Congress+BJP vote percentages taken together in 2006.

2001
In the 2001 elections, Buddhadeb Bhattacharjee of CPI(M) defeated his nearest rival Madhabi Mukherjee of AITC

 
 
 

.# Swing calculated on Congress+Trinamool Congress vote percentages taken together in 2001.

1996
In the 1996 elections, Buddhadeb Bhattacharjee of CPI(M) defeated his nearest rival Kakoli Ghosh Dastidar of INC

1977-2006
In the 2006, 2001, 1996, 1991 and 1987 state assembly elections Buddhadeb Bhattacharjee of CPI(M) won the Jadavpur assembly seat, defeating Dipak Kumar Ghosh of Trinamool Congress in 2006,Madhabi Mukherjee of Trinamool Congress in 2001, Kakoli Ghosh Dastidar of Congress in 1996, Jyoti Prasanna Das Thakur of Congress in 1991, and Probhat Chatterjee of Congress in 1987.Sankar Gupta of CPI(M) defeated Sachin Mukherjee of Congress in 1982. Dinesh Chandra Majumder of CPI(M) defeated Santimoy Chatterjee of Janata Party in 1977.

1967-1972
Dinesh Chandra Majumder of CPI(M) won in 1972 and 1971. Bikash Chandra Guha of CPI(M) won in 1969 and 1967. The Jadavpur seat did not exist prior to that.

References

Notes

Citations

Assembly constituencies of West Bengal
Politics of South 24 Parganas district